The 2017 NHL Expansion Draft was an expansion draft conducted by the National Hockey League on June 18–20, 2017 to fill the roster of the league's expansion team for the 2017–18 season, the Vegas Golden Knights. The team's selections were announced on June 21 during the NHL Awards ceremony at T-Mobile Arena.

Background
In the off-season before the 2015–16 NHL season, the league opened a window for ownership groups to bid for expansion teams for the first time since 2000. Two ownership groups submitted bids to the league, one each from Las Vegas and Quebec City. If chosen, the Vegas bid would be the first "Big Four" major professional sports league to place a franchise in Las Vegas (not counting the city's short-lived and ill-fated football teams in the Canadian Football League and XFL, who played in 1994 and 2001 respectively), but the NHL has had a limited presence in the city with annual pre-season games, beginning with an outdoor game in 1991 and the Frozen Fury series held each year since 1997. Quebec City was previously home of the Quebec Nordiques, a team that had moved in 1995 and became the Colorado Avalanche; it has hosted occasional preseason games since that time, and has constructed a new ice hockey arena to receive a potential NHL team. Due to political delays, a bid was not submitted from Seattle despite the presence of three different ownership groups publicly campaigning to start an NHL team; a number of other potential expansion sites, such as Kansas City and Saskatchewan, declined to place bids because of cost concerns.

Las Vegas was approved for the 2017–18 NHL season on June 22, 2016; at the same time the Quebec City bid was deferred, largely because of concerns over the Canadian dollar's value and the geographic balance of the league's conferences.

Rules
The initial proposal of the rules for the draft were decided upon by the NHL in March 2016. They allowed each team to either protect seven forwards, three defencemen, and one goaltender or, one goaltender and eight skaters regardless of position. Because the NHL wanted to ensure the competitive viability of any new teams, the number of protected players allowed was lower than in the 2000 NHL Expansion Draft which populated the Minnesota Wild and Columbus Blue Jackets, when each team could protect nine forwards, five defencemen, and one goalie, or two goalies, three defencemen, and seven forwards. Under these rules, each of the 30 teams would lose one top-four defencemen or third-line forward per number of new teams. Only players with more than two years of professional experience — NHL or AHL as defined in the collective bargaining agreement—were included in the draft.

Teams had to submit their list of protected players by June 17, 2017, and they had to expose at least two forwards and one defenceman that had played at least 40 games in the 2016–17 season or more than 70 games in the 2015–16 and 2016–17 seasons combined and had to still be contracted for the 2017–18 season. The exposed goaltender had to either be under contract for the 2017–18 season or became a restricted free agent in 2017. At least twenty of the thirty players selected by Vegas had to be under contract for the 2017–18 season, and they were required to select a minimum of fourteen forwards, nine defencemen and three goaltenders. Vegas was granted a 48-hour window prior to the draft to sign any pending free agent (RFA or UFA, one per team) that was left unprotected. If a team lost a player to Vegas during this signing window they did not have a player selected from their roster during this draft.

Teams were required to protect any contracted players with no move clauses (NMCs) with one of the team's slots for protected players, unless the contract expired on July 1, 2017, in which case the NMC was considered void for the draft. Players whose NMCs had limited no trade clauses had to still be protected, and any players with NMCs were able to waive the clause and become eligible for the expansion draft.

Any player picked in the expansion draft could not have their contract bought out until after the completion of the 2017–18 season. Vegas was guaranteed the same odds in the draft lottery as third lowest finishing team from the 2016–17 NHL season for the 2017 NHL Entry Draft; after their first season they were subject to same draft lottery rules as the other teams in the league. The NHL's deputy commissioner, Bill Daly, said that teams that do not follow the expansion draft rules would face penalties, saying "It's a loss of draft picks and/or players."

Protected players
The protected players' list was published on June 18, 2017.

Eastern Conference
Italics: Players protected for contractual reasons.

Western Conference

Draft results

Trades
In return for agreeing to select certain unprotected players, the Golden Knights were granted concessions by other franchises.

The Buffalo Sabres traded their sixth-round pick in the 2017 NHL Entry Draft in exchange for Vegas selecting William Carrier.
The Florida Panthers traded Reilly Smith in exchange for Vegas selecting Jonathan Marchessault and a fourth-round pick in the 2018 NHL Entry Draft.
The Carolina Hurricanes traded Boston's fifth-round pick in the 2017 NHL Entry Draft (previously acquired) in exchange for Vegas selecting Connor Brickley.
The Winnipeg Jets traded their first-round pick (13th overall) in the 2017 NHL Entry Draft and a third-round pick in the 2019 NHL Entry Draft in exchange for Vegas selecting Chris Thorburn and Columbus' first-round pick (24th overall) in the 2017 NHL Entry Draft (previously acquired by Vegas).
The Tampa Bay Lightning traded their second-round pick in the 2017 NHL Entry Draft, Pittsburgh's fourth-round pick in the 2018 NHL Entry Draft (previously acquired) and Nikita Gusev in exchange for Vegas selecting Jason Garrison.
The New York Islanders traded their first-round pick in the 2017 NHL Entry Draft, a second-round pick in the 2019 NHL Entry Draft, Mikhail Grabovski and Jake Bischoff in exchange for Vegas selecting Jean-Francois Berube.
The Anaheim Ducks traded Shea Theodore in exchange for Vegas selecting Clayton Stoner.
The Minnesota Wild traded Alex Tuch in exchange for Vegas selecting Erik Haula and a conditional third-round pick in the 2017 or 2018 NHL Entry Draft.
The Columbus Blue Jackets traded their first-round pick in the 2017 NHL Entry Draft, a second-round pick in the 2019 NHL Entry Draft and David Clarkson in exchange for Vegas selecting William Karlsson.
The Pittsburgh Penguins traded their second-round pick in the 2020 NHL Entry Draft in exchange for Vegas selecting Marc-Andre Fleury.

Post-draft
Not all players selected by the Golden Knights in the Expansion Draft would remain with the team. Some players were traded in the following days, some the day after:

 Trevor van Riemsdyk and a seventh-round pick in 2018 were traded to Carolina for Pittsburgh's second-round pick in 2017.
 David Schlemko was traded to Montreal for a fifth-round pick in 2019.
 Marc Methot was traded to Dallas for Dylan Ferguson and a second-round pick in 2020.
 Alexei Emelin was traded to Nashville for a third-round pick in 2018.
 Calvin Pickard was traded to Toronto for a sixth-round draft pick in 2018 and Tobias Lindberg.

Other players who were no longer on the Golden Knights' roster at the start of the 2017–18 NHL season include the following:

Connor Brickley signed as an unrestricted free agent with Florida on July 1, 2017.
Chris Thorburn signed as an unrestricted free agent with St. Louis on July 1, 2017.
Jean-Francois Berube signed as an unrestricted free agent with Chicago on July 1, 2017.

See also
2016–17 NHL transactions
2017 NHL Entry Draft	
2017–18 NHL season

References

National Hockey League expansion drafts
NHL Expansion Draft|NHL Expansion Draft
NHL Expansion Draft
NHL Expansion Draft
NHL Expansion Draft
NHL Expansion Draft
Expansion Draft